Gerkin may refer to:

 Steve Gerkin (1912–1978), professional baseball pitcher
 David Gerkin, member of The Red Hot Valentines
 "Gerkin for Perkin", a composition by Clifford Brown
 Jacob F. Gerkens (or Jacob T. Gerkens), Chief of Police of Los Angeles (1876–1877)

See also
 Gherkin (disambiguation)